Molina di Ledro was a comune (municipality) in Trentino in the Italian region Trentino-Alto Adige/Südtirol. On January 1, 2010 it merged (with Pieve di Ledro, Bezzecca, Concei, Tiarno di Sopra and Tiarno di Sotto) in the new municipality of Ledro. It is the most populated frazione of the municipality. It is located about 35 km southwest of Trento.

Main sights
 Giardino Botanico Preistorico di Molina di Ledro, a botanical garden of Bronze Age food plants

People
Andrea Maffei

References

External links
 Molina di Ledro on Ledro official website

Frazioni of Ledro
Former municipalities of Trentino